Desa Petaling is a township in southern Kuala Lumpur, Malaysia, in the electoral district of Bandar Tun Razak. This township is next to Bandar Tasik Selatan and is also adjacent to Kuchai Lama, Kampung Malaysia and Sri Petaling.

References

External links
 https://web.archive.org/web/20161202151431/http://www.desapetaling.com/

Suburbs in Kuala Lumpur